Phuket is a 2009  Thai short film written and directed by Aditya Assarat. The story of the friendship between a Korean actress and a limousine driver at a hotel in Phuket.

Plot

Jin (Lim Soo-jung) is a famous Korean actress who grows tired of her life.  She comes for a holiday in Thailand, but finds that even here, she cannot escape the constant disruption of phone calls and fans. She makes for Phuket, a place that holds fond memories of her youth. There, she happens to strike up a friendship with Pong (Sorapong Chatree) a hotel limousine driver, who helps Jin find true spiritual rest.

Cast
 Im Soo-jung as Jin
 Sorapong Chatree as Pong
 Supannada Plubthong as Assistant

Release
Phuket completed filming in August 2009.
 The film premiered on October 9, 2009 during the 14th Pusan International Film Festival.
 The film been released on September 30, 2010 in Thailand.
 The film aired on Bluesky Channel in Thailand on February 14, 2012 at 8:30 pm, which falls on Valentines Day.

References

External links

2009 films
Thai short films
Thai-language films
2000s Korean-language films
Films set in Phuket
Films shot in Thailand